Mount King is a large, smooth-crested mountain in the eastern extremity of the Tula Mountains. Part of the Australian Antarctic Gazetteer (Australian Antarctic Gazetteer Id 1581) and the SCAR Composite Gazetteer of Antarctica, it is located in Enderby Land, East Antarctica, which is claimed by Australia as part of the Australian Antarctic Territory. The head of Beaver Glacier is located very close to the base of Mount King.

Mount King was discovered and mapped in December, 1958, by an ANARE (Australian National Antarctic Research Expeditions) dog-sledge party led by G.A. Knuckey. Named after Peter W. King, radio officer at Mawson in 1957 and 1958, a member of the dog-sledge party.

Flora and fauna
To date, no flora or fauna have been observed within 1.0 degrees of Mount King:

References

External links
 Australian Antarctic Division
 Australian Antarctic Gazetteer
 Australian Antarctic Names and Medals Committee (AANMC)
 United States Geological Survey, Geographic Names Information System (GNIS)
 Scientific Committee on Antarctic Research (SCAR)
 Composite Gazetteer of Antarctica
 PDF Map of the Australian Antarctic Territory
 Mawson Station
 ANARE Club
 List of Peaks in Enderby Land

King